Joanna Kulig (born 24 June 1982) is a Polish actress and singer. She gained recognition for her starring role in the 2018 historical drama film Cold War, which earned her the European Film Award and the Polish Academy Award for Best Actress.

After an unsuccessful attempt at a career as a jazz singer, Kulig enrolled at the AST National Academy of Theatre Arts in Kraków, graduating in 2007. She began performing on stage while still in drama school, debuting in the play A Midsummer Night's Dream. Her first starring film role in the 2007 drama Wednesday, Thursday Morning won her the award for Best Debut at the Gdynia Film Festival. She received further acclaim for her performance in the 2011 film Elles, which earned her the Polish Academy Award and her second award at the Gdynia Film Festival, both for Best Supporting Actress.

Kulig became known for her frequent collaborations with the director Paweł Pawlikowski. She appeared in three of his films: The Woman in the Fifth (2011), the Academy Award-winning Ida (2013) and Cold War (2018). Her other notable credits include the highest-grossing Polish film of all time Clergy (2018), and the Netflix series The Eddy (2020).

Early life and education
Kulig was born on 24 June 1982 in Krynica, Lesser Poland Voivodeship, Poland. Her mother worked as a cook at a local kindergarten and her father was a folk poet. She was raised with four siblings in Muszynka. Her younger sister, Justyna Schneider, is also an actress and adopted their great-grandmother's surname to avoid confusion as their first names are similar.

While still living in Krynica, Kulig graduated from the Frédéric Chopin First Degree State Music School where she studied piano. At 18, she moved to Kraków, and enrolled at the Mieczysław Karłowicz State Music School Complex, from which she graduated in singing. In the meantime, she also completed the Kraków Vocational Technical High School for Hotel Administration. In 2007, Kulig earned an acting degree with a specialisation in singing from the AST National Academy of Theatre Arts in Kraków. She was the first in her family to graduate from a university. Kulig initially wanted to be a professional jazz singer. She applied twice to study jazz at the Karol Szymanowski Academy of Music, but was rejected on both occasions. She was also interested in conducting, but was also unsuccessful. She explained: "no one wanted me, so I went to university to do drama and singing," which started her acting career.

Career

1998–2018: Career beginnings and stardom in Poland
In 1998, Kulig won an episode of the Polish television talent show Szansa na sukces by performing Grzegorz Turnau's song "Między ciszą a ciszą". She took part in the show's annual final, and came third. Turnau later invited her to sing with him on his 2002 album Nawet. Kulig also participated in season two of the Polish television talent show Idol in 2002. She was eliminated in the semi-finals.

Kulig made her stage debut in 2006 as Hermia in the play A Midsummer Night's Dream at the Helena Modrzejewska National Stary Theater in Kraków. She made her film debut in 2007 in Grzegorz Pacek's drama Wednesday, Thursday Morning, which earned her the Gdynia Film Festival award for Best Debut. In 2011, she starred in two films set in France; she was partnered with Juliette Binoche for Małgorzata Szumowska's drama Elles, in which she played Alicja, a Polish economics student who moonlights as a prostitute. The film premiered to mixed reception, though Kulig's performance received praise. Kevin Jagernauth of IndieWire opined that she "has the potential to be breakout star boasting a strong screen presence and an undeniable beauty". She won the Polish Academy Award for Best Supporting Actress, and another recognition at the Gdynia Film Festival for Best Supporting Actress. In Paweł Pawlikowskis psychological thriller The Woman in the Fifth, she portrayed Ania, a Polish barmaid who falls in love with the protagonist American writer Tom Ricks (Ethan Hawke).

In 2013, Kulig appeared in Jacek Borcuch's drama Lasting, and in Pawlikowski's Academy Award-winning drama Ida. She also had a small part in the blockbuster Hansel & Gretel: Witch Hunters, which required her to wear prosthetics. She received her second Polish Academy Award nomination for Best Supporting Actress for her role in the foremost. In 2014, she was cast in a leading role on the Polish sitcom O mnie się nie martw, starring as Iga in its first nine seasons until 2018. Kulig starred in two commercially successful Polish films, Disco Polo and Pitbull: Tough Women, in 2015 and 2016 respectively, the latter of which was the highest-grossing film of 2016 in Poland. She also portrayed Sister Irena in Anne Fontaine's critically acclaimed 2016 drama The Innocents.

2018–present: International success

Kulig's international breakthrough came in 2018 when she starred in Pawlikowski's historical drama film Cold War. The film marked their third collaboration, which prompted Pawlikowski to call her his "muse". The part of Zula, a woman in post-war Poland who joins a folk music touring group, was written specifically for her. In the film, Kulig notably performs the traditional Polish folk song "Dwa serduszka" ("Two Hearts"). Mark Kermode of The Observer wrote that she "delivers a star-making performance of astonishing range and depth", and Mick LaSalle of San Francisco Chronicle stated that "she takes the role of a lifetime between her teeth, chomps on it, pounds it into the ground and never lets go for a second." According to Scott Feinberg of The Hollywood Reporter, "in a fair world ... Kulig would not only be a serious contender for a best actress nom, but would quickly become an in-demand actress in Hollywood, too." Kulig received the Best Actress Award at the 31st European Film Awards, and the Polish Academy Award for Best Actress for her performance. That same year, she played local priest's girlfriend with whom she gets pregnant in Wojciech Smarzowski's controversial film Clergy, which went on to become the highest-grossing Polish film of all time.

Kulig starred as jazz singer Maja in Damien Chazelle's 2020 Netflix musical drama series The Eddy. She served as one of the jurors of the Un Certain Regard section at the 2022 Cannes Film Festival. That year, she had a starring role opposite Gilles Lellouche in the action thriller Kompromat directed by Jérôme Salle. In 2023, she starred in Rebecca Miller's romantic comedy She Came to Me alongside Peter Dinklage, Anne Hathaway, Marisa Tomei and Brian d'Arcy James. Kulig was Miller's first choice for the role of a Polish immigrant Magdalena as she regards her "the greatest Polish actress, I know". Despite the mixed reception of the film, Kate Erbland of IndieWire found Kulig's performance "heartbreaking", and David Rooney of The Hollywood Reporter thought that "only Kulig ... registers as a compassionate presence grounded in a modicum of truth."

Kulig is set to make a guest appearance in the upcoming Apple TV+ miniseries Masters of the Air, and will star in Michael Keaton's noir thriller Knox Goes Away. She has also been cast in Małgorzata Szumowska and Michał Englerts drama Let Me Out.

Personal life
In 2009, Kulig married film director and screenwriter Maciej Bochniak. She gave birth to their son in February 2019.

Kulig starred in the autumn-winter 2018 avertising campaign for Reserved, alongside Jeanne Damas. She was named Woman of the Year by Glamour Poland in 2018, and ranked fourth on Polish magazine Wprosts 2019 list of the 50 most influential Polish women.

Acting credits

Film

Television

Stage

Radio

Awards and nominations

References

External links

1982 births
21st-century Polish actresses
European Film Award for Best Actress winners
Living people
People from Krynica-Zdrój
Polish film actresses
Polish stage actresses
Polish television actresses